Lord Bingham was Thomas Bingham, Baron Bingham of Cornhill (1933–2010).

Lord Bingham may also refer to:

George Bingham, 8th Earl of Lucan (born 1967), known as Lord Bingham until 2016 
John Bingham, 7th Earl of Lucan (born 1934; presumed dead), known as Lord Bingham from 1949 until 1964
George Bingham, 6th Earl of Lucan (1898–1964), known as Lord Bingham from 1914 to 1949
George Bingham, 5th Earl of Lucan (1860–1949), known as Lord Bingham from 1888 to 1914
George Bingham, 4th Earl of Lucan (1830–1914), known as Lord Bingham from 1839 to 1888
George Bingham, 3rd Earl of Lucan (1800–1888), known as Lord Bingham before 1839
Richard Bingham, 2nd Earl of Lucan (1764–1839), known as Lord Bingham from 1795 to 1799

See also 
Earl of Lucan